New Economy movement may refer to:
 
 New Economy movement - alternative economic theory
 New Economy Movement in the United States - group of organizations

See also
 New Economics (disambiguation)